The  is a Japanese aerial lift line in Matsuyama, Ehime, operated by the city government. Opened in 1955, the line goes to Matsuyama Castle on Mount Katsuyama. The former cabins were famous for being decorated like Edo period litter vehicles. There is also a chairlift line parallel to and beside the tramway.

Basic data
Cable length: 
Vertical interval:

See also
List of aerial lifts in Japan

Aerial tramways in Japan
1955 establishments in Japan